Marcilhac-sur-Célé, commonly referred to simply as Marcilhac, is a commune in the Lot department in the Occitania region in Southwestern France. It has many historic buildings, including the ruined 9th century Abbey of St Peter. As of 2019, it had a population of 203.

Gallery

See also
Communes of the Lot department

References

Marcilhacsurcele